Altyn Peak is located in the Lewis Range, Glacier National Park in the U.S. state of Montana. Altyn Peak is situated just north of Swiftcurrent Lake and the Many Glacier Hotel and is easily seen from both locations. The peak is named after Dave Greenwood Altyn who was a financial backer of a local mine in the late 1800s; the mining town of Altyn was at the junction of Canyon Creek and Swiftcurrent Lake. The peak was known as Crow Feet Mountain after the last chief of the Blackfeet confederacy of tribes.

See also
 Mountains and mountain ranges of Glacier National Park (U.S.)

References

Mountains of Glacier County, Montana
Mountains of Glacier National Park (U.S.)
Lewis Range